Computer Love may refer to:
 Computer Love (album), an album by Australian artists TZU
 "Computer Love" (Zapp & Roger song)
 "Computer Love" (Kraftwerk song)
 "Computer Love", a song by the band Eruption

Computer love, a song by Vedo